Angelo Martha (born 29 April 1982 in Amsterdam) is a Dutch-Curaçaoan footballer who currently plays for SV Spakenburg in Dutch third division. He is a defender who plays as a centre back.

Martha's career began when he signed a professional contract with Cambuur Leeuwarden, making his first first-team appearance in 2002, at the age of 20. After 2 years with the team from Friesland he joined fellow Eerste Divisie participants MVV Maastricht at the start of the 2004–05 season. He developed himself into a first team regular before moving again in December 2005. He then joined Eredivisie side ADO Den Haag. In the summer of 2007 he went to Willem II, where he did not play any match in two and a half years. Therefore, he went on loan to FC Emmen in January 2009. In the summer of 2009 he went to FC Den Bosch on a free transfer. After one season he left Den Bosch and signed a two-year contract with AGOVV Apeldoorn.

On 11 March 2007 he played his first Eredivisie 2006/2007 match for ADO against Vitesse Arnhem

References

External links
adodenhaag.nl
clubachterdeduinen.nl

1982 births
Living people
Dutch Antillean footballers
Netherlands Antilles international footballers
Curaçao international footballers
Curaçao footballers
Association football defenders
ADO Den Haag players
SC Cambuur players
MVV Maastricht players
FC Den Bosch players
Willem II (football club) players
AGOVV Apeldoorn players
Eredivisie players
Eerste Divisie players
Footballers from Amsterdam